Banashankari is a 1977 Indian Kannada film, directed by K. S. L. Swamy (Ravi) and produced by M. Peethambaram. The film stars K. R. Vijaya, Kalyan Kumar, K. S. Ashwath and S. Shivaram in the lead roles. The film has musical score by Vijaya Bhaskar.

Cast

K. R. Vijaya
Kalyan Kumar
K. S. Ashwath
S. Shivaram
Udaykumar
Ambareesh
Thoogudeepa Srinivas
Puttanna Puranik
B. Hanumanthachar
Kodandu
M. N. Lakshmidevi
B. V. Radha
Vijaya Lalitha
B. Jaya
Jayanthi in Guest Appearance
C. H. Lokanath in Guest Appearance
Bhavani in Guest Appearance

References

External links
 

1977 films
1970s Kannada-language films
Films scored by Vijaya Bhaskar
Films directed by K. S. L. Swamy
Films set in Bangalore
Films shot in Bangalore